The Phare Tower (Tour Phare), in English, "Beacon Tower", was a planned approx. 300-metre (984 ft) tall skyscraper with 71 floors designed as a green building to be built in Courbevoie (Hauts-de-Seine), France, in the  La Défense district of suburban Paris. The building was being designed by Los Angeles-based Morphosis, headed by architect Thom Mayne, and  would have been completed in 2018. Had it been built, it would have been the tallest skyscraper in Paris and one of the tallest in the European Union.

Name
While the French word phare means lighthouse  (from Pharos) when employed alone, it also applies to any source of light used as a beacon. In this context, phare is used to describe the tower as something that will bring attention. Tour Phare was meant to bring an architectural beacon to the periphery of Paris and more specifically La Défense.

See also
 List of tallest buildings and structures in the Paris region

Sources
 Design Build Network: Le Phare
 Treehugger: Thom Mayne to Build Big Eco-Tower in Paris
 Marvelous Architectures: Paris plans rival to Eiffel Tower

External links
 Official Phare Tower article by Morphosis

References

La Défense
Proposed skyscrapers in France